The Democratic Front (DF / Демократски фронт, ДФ) is a multi-ethnic social-democratic and social-liberal political party in Bosnia and Herzegovina. Its current leader and founder of DF is Željko Komšić, the incumbent Croat member of Presidency of Bosnia and Herzegovina.

History
The Democratic Front was founded by Željko Komšić on 7 April 2013, the current Croat member of the Presidency of Bosnia and Herzegovina, who left the Social Democratic Party of Bosnia and Herzegovina in July 2012.

List of presidents

Elections

Parliamentary elections

Presidency elections

Cantonal elections

References

External links
Official website

2013 establishments in Bosnia and Herzegovina
Political parties established in 2013
Bosnian nationalism
Civic nationalism
Social democratic parties in Bosnia and Herzegovina
Pro-European political parties in Bosnia and Herzegovina